The discography of Australian Christian music praise & worship group Hillsong Worship consists of twenty-six live albums, four extended plays (EPs), three compilation albums, and 19 singles.

Discography

Studio albums

Live albums

Extended plays
 God Is Able (2011)
 Cornerstone (2012)
 O Praise the Name (Anástasis) (2015)
 What a Beautiful Name (2017)
 There Is More: Studio Sessions (2018)
 At Easter (2021)

Compilation albums
 The Platinum Collection: Shout to the Lord 1 (2000)
 The Platinum Collection: Shout to the Lord 2 (2003)
 God Is Able (worktapes) (2011)

Singles

Promotional singles

Other charted songs

References

Discographies of Australian artists
Christian music discographies